Remi Korchemny (born 23 June 1932) is the former sprint coach of a number of high-profile athletes, including Soviet Olympic champion Valeri Borzov. He is serving a lifetime ban from the sport for his involvement in providing performance-enhancing drugs.

After the 1972 Olympics, Korchemny moved to America. There he worked as a coach or advisor for a number of high-profile athletes, including British sprinter Dwain Chambers, and American athletes Kelli White, Chryste Gaines, Chris Phillips, Alvin Harrison, John Register and Jamaican athlete Grace Jackson.

Life in the Soviet Union 
Korchemny was born on 23 June 1932 in Ukraine. In 1937, when he was five years old, his father was executed by firing squad on charges of sabotage amid a labor dispute while his mother was sent to a forced labor camp for four years, leaving Korchemny to live with his grandparents. As an impoverished youth, he would race the boys at his school for food.

Drafted into the Red Army as an engineer, he was introduced to athletics, eventually becoming a coach in 1957. During the 1972 Munich Olympics, his sprinter Valeriy Borzov won the Olympic gold medals in the 100m and 200m. In 1975, after years of lobbying to leave the Soviet Union, Korchemny was allowed to move to the United States following brief stays in Israel and Italy.

BALCO scandal
Korchemny was one of the main figures in the 2003 BALCO scandal. He was indicted on 12 February 2004, and on 29 July 2005, he pleaded guilty in US District Court to distributing illegal performance-enhancing drugs to athletes between 2000 and 2003. Korchemny was sentenced to one year of probation on 24 February 2006, avoiding potential years of jail time. In the aftermath of the scandal, Korchemny agreed to retire on 12 March 2007. He was the first coach disciplined by the United States Anti-Doping Agency. Korchemny is serving a lifetime ban from  USA Track & Field for conspiracy and cover-up.

Post-scandal 
In 2013, BALCO founder Victor Conte enlisted Korchemny to train the boxers he worked with such as Amir Khan. In 2019, he coached professional boxer Mikey Garcia, who was contending for the IBF welterweight championship title against Errol Spence Jr.

References

External links
 Mary Nicole Nazzaro: Beijing Olympic Journal: Remi Korchemny Revisited American Track & Field, March/April 2006
 Mary Nicole Nazzaro: Remi Korchemny: The Art of Coaching American Track & Field, Winter 2002
Remi Korchemny's scientific contributions at ResearchGate

American track and field coaches
Drugs in sport
People from Alameda County, California
Ukrainian athletics coaches
1932 births
Living people